Replay value (or, colloquially, replayability) is the potential of a video game or other media products for continued play value after its first completion. Factors that can influence perceived replay value include the game's extra characters, secrets and alternate endings. The replay value of a game may also be based entirely on the individual's tastes. A player might enjoy repeating a game because of the music, graphics, gameplay or because of product loyalty. Dynamic environments, challenging AI, a wide variety of ways to accomplish tasks, and a rich array of assets could result in a high replay value.

Influencing factors

Plot

A game with a linear plot will typically have a lower replay value due to the limited choices a character can make. Games that offer more choices in regard to what the player can do, such as strategy games, roguelikes or construction and management sims, tend to have higher replay value since the player might be able to make each play through different.

As a non-video game example, consider the difference between a "traditional" book and a choose-your-own-adventure book. For a traditional book the reader will read it from start to finish, and should they choose to re-read it the plot would remain constant, thus offering the same experience the second time around. The plot of a choose-your-own-adventure book, on the other hand, is more varied and different events would occur, some that the reader might not have seen the last time they read it, prompting the reader to read through the book again even if they have done so just moments before.

In the case of role-playing video games (RPGs), plots can be linear or non-linear. The plots of older RPGs tended to show little to no plot changes with each play through. A good example of an RPG with a non-linear plot is Mass Effect and its sequel, Mass Effect 2. Role playing games released in later years allow for more freedom. For instance, choosing to be ruthless instead of lenient might prevent certain events from taking place (or even cause new ones to occur). Likewise, allowing a particular character into the party could cause the plot to branch off in a new direction, if even for a short time. A good example of this point is the character Juhani in Star Wars: Knights of the Old Republic. The player has the option of killing her or sparing her life. Should the player be merciful, Juhani joins the player's party. Later in the game, the player will then run into an enemy from her past.

Multiple classes

This is the ability to play as different characters each time through the game. For example, the game Diablo allows the player to choose one of three character classes: warrior, rogue, or sorcerer. Party-based RPGs can have a good degree of replayability, even if the plot is essentially linear. The plot of Final Fantasy remained the same with each play through, but since the player was able to choose their party of four from six different classes they could choose a new party configuration with each new game. The Final Fantasy instruction manual even gave the player ideas for different types of parties (well-balanced, heavy magic use, combat oriented characters, etc.). In Final Fantasy you can choose from the classes of Fighter, Thief, White Mage, Black Mage, Monk, and Red Mage, providing the player with 15 possible character combinations with 4 distinct classes, or 126 with repetition.

Multitude of classes, accompanied by a multitude of races, is another typical characteristic of roguelike games. For example, Dungeon Crawl at this moment employs 22 races and 23 classes, allowing a total of 654 race/class combinations (although about a dozen of them are disallowed due to in-game race/religion constraints). Typically, some races are more suited for some classes, and much less suited towards others (an ogre usually makes a great fighter, but a very lousy wizard). Such "unsuited" combinations may prove an extra challenge for an experienced player, yet it's not frequent for this challenge to be high to the point of the game being unwinnable.

Multiple characters

In some RPGs, such as Skies of Arcadia, the player controls the leader of a party of characters, and additional members will join the group if the player makes the right decisions. It is unlikely that a player will "collect" every possible member on their first attempt, so they may choose to play through the story again in order to acquire the full cast.

Different characters offer new ways to tackle the obstacles within the game. They may also offer unique dialogue options and opportunities to interact with other players. The SquareSoft RPG Chrono Cross was an example of this with over 40 characters available for play.

In the case of action-oriented games, there may be some areas in the game that are only reachable using a character with certain abilities. For example, in the Sega game Sonic the Hedgehog 3, the character Knuckles can explore areas that other characters cannot.

Some games might offer a wide array of characters from whom to choose to play with, but gamers are usually deterred from replaying if all characters share the same story line and function more or less the same. This is the case of Mercenaries: Playground of Destruction and its sequel: the player can choose one out of three mercenaries to play with, but the story line remains the same, and the differences in gameplay (speed, strength and stealth) are too subtle to invite further replays.

Alternate paths
Some games give the player a choice of which path they want to take through the game. Two good examples are Castlevania III: Dracula's Curse and Shadow the Hedgehog. In Castlevania III, the hero Trevor Belmont can choose which path he takes to Dracula's castle. Additionally, the route he takes allows him to encounter three different companions. In Shadow the Hedgehog, Shadow must choose to do Neutral (self-work), Dark (evil work) or Hero (Heroic Work) in a stage (i.e. choosing whether to destroy all the humans in Dark, destroy all the black aliens in Hero, or to collect the Chaos Emeralds for himself in Neutral), and depending on what Shadow does, this will affect the next stage played and the storyline. There are 10 endings in the game that range from Shadow destroying Earth to Shadow accepting he was destructive through his life and that he himself shouldn't exist. Once all endings are unlocked, a true/canonical ending is played.

The first two Resident Evil games featured two main scenarios, each with its own protagonist, supporting characters and scripted sequence of events. Choosing one character over the other usually meant following his/her own story line, set along different routes but on the same location and occasionally crossing paths with the other character. Scenarios would differ by balancing odds and obstacles - an action-oriented scenario for the strong, male protagonist and a more puzzle-oriented scenario for the comparatively weaker, but faster female protagonist. Beating each scenario was required to get 100% completion, as well as all aspects of the story.

In the point and click game genre, Indiana Jones and the Fate of Atlantis offers three paths. The paths are called; Wits, Fists and Team path. The first two paths Indiana Jones leaves alone depending to complete mission basses on either thinking (wits) or fighting (fists) whereas in the third Sophia (team) tags along. Another example appears in the game Blade Runner, where Ray McCoy has to decide where to head and with precise timing events might occur otherwise an alternate path then must be taken. These path are random and some require time-accurate triggering.

Procedural generation in roguelike games, leads to high replayability, as no two games were alike.

Performance grading
A number of modern multi-level games, especially puzzle games, encourage players to repeat and fully master previously completed levels with a star rating or a letter-grading system, in which the player will be graded for how well they performed in finishing each level.  Such a system intends to encourage players to find ways to play certain levels better than they did before and gain a sense of satisfactory completion and closure from achieving the highest performance rating for each level. This is evident in games like Angry Birds and the Candy Crush Saga trilogy.

Unlockable characters and content

Sometimes beating the game or completing certain challenges will allow the player to use an NPC from the game or even a new character. For instance, in Baldur's Gate: Dark Alliance, the drow ranger Drizzt Do'Urden is an unlockable character. Other examples of unlockable content can include art, music, behind-the-scenes featurettes, and interviews with a game's producer, artist, or voice talent. Electronic Arts' games based on The Two Towers and The Return of the King feature many different unlockables of this nature. As the player progresses through the game, he can view production stills from the movies, concept art, and interviews with some of the actors. Completing either game unlocks new characters, missions, and cheat codes.

Many games enhance replayability by unlocking a second, minor story mode once the main game's beaten. This second story or sub-scenario usually functions on the same game physics/mechanics and is set in an already explored area, and its main function is to expand on the main game's story and its unanswered questions, often focusing on a secondary character now turned protagonist, and his/her point of view. Kingdom Hearts: Chain of Memories features a 'Revers/Rebirth' sub-scenario that differs from regular gameplay and centers on secondary character Riku rather than Sora. This story plays during and after the events of the main game. Likewise, the 'Separate Ways' mini-game of Resident Evil 4 has the player take hold of Ada Wong, whose path intertwines with that of the game's protagonist, Leon S. Kennedy. The same plotpoints and events are retold from her perspective. A reedited version of Silent Hill 2 features the 'Born From a Wish' scenario, chronicling events prior to the game's main scenario through the eyes of key character Maria.

Alternate endings

One of the most common ways to increase the replay value of a game is to offer multiple endings. These endings are often based on the choices the player makes during the game, like choosing to be good or evil. An early example of alternate endings was Metroid, having increasingly revealing endings depending on how fast the player completed the game. Later games in the series would determine the ending based on either time or completeness (sometimes both), but Metroid: Zero Mission and the Japanese version of Metroid Fusion included art galleries unlocked through getting an ending, meaning a player must obtain all endings to complete the galleries. Several games based on the Star Wars series make use of alternate endings, such as Knights of the Old Republic, Knights of the Old Republic II: The Sith Lords, and Jedi Knight: Jedi Academy. The endings for these games are based on whether the player chooses the Light Side or the Dark Side of the Force. Some times, the endings can just be for entertainment purposes, like in Tony Hawk's Underground, when the player completes the game twice, instead of having to do Eric's line, he punches Eric and takes the tape. Marvel: Ultimate Alliance is another game with multiple endings. During the course of the adventure the player will need to make decisions (such as choosing whether to save Nightcrawler or Jean Grey) or complete certain tasks (like stopping a group of mutated soldiers from destroying a computer that holds research on the Legacy Virus). After completing the game, Uatu the Watcher will give a glimpse into the future and tell the player what the consequences of his or her actions are.

Of note is how the Knights of the Old Republic games make use of several of these factors to increase replay value. In the first Knights of the Old Republic game, the player chooses one of three classes: soldier, scout, or scoundrel. Later in the game the player chooses one of the three Jedi classes (Guardian, Sentinel, or Counselor). Thus, the player has nine possible character combination choices. In Knights II, the player starts as one of these three Jedi classes and gets to choose a prestige class. Additionally, the player gains different followers depending on whether they select to be male or female and Light Side or Dark Side. Both games allow the player to customize their characters by selecting various skills and feats. Thus, a player might choose to focus on two-weapon fighting for one play through and single-weapon fighting in the next.

The Silent Hill franchise is famous for featuring at least three alternate endings per game. Often, a game will force a specific ending on the first play through, upon which new alternate endings will unlock during a replay, should the player meet certain requirements, perform certain tasks or obtain certain objects. Silent Hill 2 alone features a total of six possible endings - three regular endings, which can be obtained after the first play-through, as well as a bonus ending following a replay, and two unlockable "joke endings". Almost all games feature a joke "UFO ending", whereupon UFOs descend from the sky in an unlikely turn of events. Because there is little narrative continuity between the games, there are no canonical endings, except those of Silent Hill: Origins and the original Silent Hill (due to each having sequels which corroborate one specific ending). Because of the multiplicity of outcomes, unlockable features and the canonical blurr, these alternate endings are considered to enhance replayability.

Many RPGs feature alternate endings, depending on player choices and quests completed. To unlock the Kingdom Hearts secret ending, one must complete the game 100% by fulfilling all mini-game sidequests and collectibles, beating all tournament enemies and locking each world's keyhole. Chrono Trigger features 13 endings, which are based on when the player defeats Lavos.

Grand Theft Auto IV features two endings, where Niko Bellic is asked by his associate Jimmy Pegorino to strike a deal with his bitter enemy Dimitri Rascalov or exact revenge on him. Niko remains triumphant in both endings, and the two main antagonists, Dimitri and Pegorino, die. The main difference between the two endings is that either Niko's cousin Roman Bellic or his love interest Kate McReary end up dying. What is ironic is that the one who gives him advice is the one to end up dying. The outcome of the war in Mercenaries: Playground of Destruction depends on the player's current standing with each of the game's factions. That which stands the friendliest with the player will be featured as the victor of the war, though the game's sequel establishes China as the canonical victor.

In S.T.A.L.K.E.R.: Shadow of Chernobyl, players are given the option of completing the game with seven different endings. Five of these are deemed false as they are determined through in-game wealth, karma, and certain choices throughout the game. The "true" endings are called so due to the unique ending which triggers a cut-scene involving the protagonist. GSC Game World, the creator the series, also came out with two other S.T.A.L.K.E.R. games. S.T.A.L.K.E.R.: Call of Pripyat offers a more varied ending path with 20 different affecting actions. Some say the game has over 200 endings.

The game Blade Runner is another example of such with as many as thirteen multiple endings. Depending on choices, timings and multiple event triggings, the player can end up with one of the many endings. Each ending doesn't have a fixed path and can be reached through by any path depending on before mentioned factors.

Online gaming
In massively multiplayer online games and other types of online game, the other human-controlled players give the gameplay a greater variety than permitted by the AI of computer-controlled bots, as well as allowing chatting and other interaction between players, thus increasing the length of time the player will spend on the game.

Other factors

Games where the map and starting position is different every time you play it, in for example strategy games with a random map generator, also tend to have long-lasting appeal. The community-developed mods for many games also contribute to increased replayability and long life for many games. Due to the limits of AI behavior and the appeal and challenge in playing against friends, multiplayer is also often considered to increase the lifespan of a game. For example, Worms Armageddon, a comparable simple and old (1999) game, is still popular online.

Variety in gameplay is not essential to replayability. Many arcade games, especially from the golden age of arcade games, are completely linear, yet people continue to play these games, even those that have been around for decades. A clear example can be seen in Tetris. The gameplay is extremely simple compared to more modern games; yet it is arguably one of the most addictive video games ever made.

Also there is the option to replay a segment of the game. Some notable games, most frequently shooters, permit this. They include History Civil War: Secret Missions, Battlefield and the Call of Duty series. These games generally have only a short singleplayer campaign and focus on multiplayer gameplay. Both the inability to replay missions and a lack of multiplayer activities proved damaging to Mafia II, a game with high expectations. The critics, most notably IGN, praised the game for its graphics and gameplay, but it fell down because of the lack of side missions and inability to replay missions.

In contrast, some games encourage replaying missions by adding time trial and time attack modes. Other games, such as the Assassin's Creed series have a secondary objective that may be difficult to complete, but necessary for additional elements to be unlocked. For instance, a mission may revolve around killing a specific NPC. The secondary objective may be to kill him in a specific way or to avoid detection. If the player fails to complete the secondary objective on the first attempt, they can revisit the mission later.

Many Japanese RPGs include a New Game+ mode which lets players replay the entire game using select items or abilities from their first play through. This is enabled after the game is finished.

Other times, players may themselves impose new special restrictions on a game to make it more difficult even if the game is linear. Examples include Nuzlocke runs in Pokémon or speed runs in a wide variety of games.

See also
High score

References

Video game design
Video game terminology